George Franklyn Yerex (1893–1967) was a New Zealand soldier and wildlife ranger. 
He was born in Wellington, Wellington, New Zealand on 30 January 1893, and died in Te Awamutu on 17 January 1967.

References

1893 births
1967 deaths
New Zealand military personnel
People from Wellington City
New Zealand military personnel of World War I
New Zealand Army officers
People educated at Wellington College (New Zealand)